Richard Tovey (25 December 1930 – 31 May 2002) was an Australian cricketer. He played first-class cricket for Auckland and Queensland between 1957 and 1964.

See also
 List of Auckland representative cricketers

References

External links
 

1930 births
2002 deaths
Australian cricketers
Auckland cricketers
Queensland cricketers
Cricketers from Sydney